Gong Byung-min (born 4 July 1991) is a South Korean freestyle wrestler. He represented South Korea at the 2018 Asian Games held in Indonesia and he won one of the bronze medals in the men's 74 kg event.

Major results

References

External links 
 

Living people
1991 births
Place of birth missing (living people)
South Korean male sport wrestlers
Asian Games medalists in wrestling
Wrestlers at the 2018 Asian Games
Medalists at the 2018 Asian Games
Asian Games bronze medalists for South Korea
Asian Wrestling Championships medalists
21st-century South Korean people